Franz Tapper or Franz Tappers (1886–1976) was a German film producer.

Selected filmography
 Paganini (1934)
 The Schimeck Family (1935)
 A Woman of No Importance (1936)
 Covered Tracks (1938)
 The Journey to Tilsit (1939)
 Pedro Will Hang (1941)
 The Roedern Affair (1944)
 The Dubarry (1951)
 Klettermaxe (1952)
 Weekend in Paradise (1952)
 Don't Forget Love  (1953)
 Three from Variety (1954)
 Three Days Confined to Barracks (1955)

References

Bibliography 
 Charles P. Mitchell. The Great Composers Portrayed on Film, 1913 through 2002. McFarland, 2004.

External links 
 

1886 births
1976 deaths
German film producers
Film people from Hamburg